Maryna Dubrova (born 9 December 1978) is a Ukrainian long-distance runner who specializes in the 5000 metres.

Achievements

Personal bests
1500 metres - 4:06.94 min (2004)
3000 metres - 8:50.34 min (2004)
5000 metres - 15:02.73 min (2004)
Half marathon - 1:17:52 min (2003)

External links

1978 births
Living people
Ukrainian female long-distance runners
20th-century Ukrainian women
21st-century Ukrainian women